The 1914–15 season was Manchester United's 23rd season in the Football League and eighth in the First Division.

During the season a match-fixing scandal occurred when a league match between Manchester United and Liverpool at Old Trafford on 2 April 1915 was fixed in United's favour, with players from both sides benefiting from bets placed upon the result. An investigation by the Football Association was launched and found that players from both sides had been involved in rigging the match: Sandy Turnbull, Arthur Whalley and Enoch West of United, and Jackie Sheldon, Tom Miller, Bob Pursell and Thomas Fairfoul of Liverpool; Sheldon was a former United player himself and was found to be the plot's ringleader.

This was also the last season before no competitive football was played between 1915 and 1919 due to the First World War.

First Division

FA Cup

See also
1915 British football betting scandal

References

Manchester United F.C. seasons
Manchester United